Serajul Alam Khan (also known as "Dada" and "Dadabhai"; born January 6, 1941) is a Bangladeshi political analyst, philosopher and writer. He is one of the founders of [Swadhin Bangla Biplobi Parishad Alisa Nucleus (Whose Pseudonym Nucleus)] in English Independent Bengal Revolutionary Council, a secret organisation of Chhatra League, which played a significant role in the Bangladesh Liberation War. He along with Tofael Ahmed, Sheikh Fazlul Haque Moni and Abdur Razzaq formed and commanded Mujib Bahini (aka BLF).

Biography
Alam Khan served as the general secretary of the student political organization East Pakistan Chhatra League from 1963 to 1965.

Soon after returning to free the country from dissension within pro-liberation mainstream power base, Serajul became conspicuous between left-of-center leadership and simmering far left young radicals. Khan was involved in a political struggle with Sheikh Fazlul Haque Mani. Alam Khan developed an ideological difference from Sheikh Fazlul Haque Mani, due to the former's advocacy of scientific socialism, thus forming the Jatiyo Samajtantrik Dal. In 1975, Sheikh Fazlul Haque Mani urged him to join BaKSAL, but he refused.

Current activities
Alam Khan now serves as a professor of political science in the University of Wisconsin-Oshkosh, a post he has held since 1996. In 2006, he was hospitalized in London and underwent a bypass operation.

References

Further reading
 
 
 
 
 
 
 

Living people
Bangladeshi academics
University of Dhaka alumni
Jatiya Samajtantrik Dal politicians
1941 births
University of Wisconsin–Oshkosh faculty